Khao Nam Khang National Park is a national park in Thailand. It was declared the 65th national park on July, 22 1990.

Overview
The area is 132,500 rai ~ . Its name "Khao Nam Khang" means "dew mountain". Because it is a mountain that is the border between Thailand and Malaysia, thus making this place a base for the Malay Chinese Communist terrorists during the cold war era. Most of the area is a tropical rainforest. Entry fees include 20 baht for adult, and 10 baht for child (Thai), 100 baht for adult, and 50 baht for child (foreigner).

Natural resources

Flora
The flora of plants that can be found here are Hopea odorata, champak, Parashorea stellata, Homalium tomentosum, Cynometra iripa, Dipterocarpus turbinatus, Salacca wallichiana, including mosses, ferns, and various types of orchids, etc.

Fauna
Wildlife species include wild boar, sun bear, mainland serow, southern pig-tailed macaque, barking deer, gibbon, Malayan tapir, black leopard, mouse-deer, palm civet, tortoise, as well as various species of birds, such as hornbill, great argus, pheasant, green peacock, green-legged partridge, etc.

Sights
There are many places of interest in the park
Khao Nam Khang Historic Tunnel: highlight of the park, about 4 km (2.4 mi) from the park office
Phru Ching Waterfall: the highest waterfall in the park away from the park office about 4 km.
Ton Peak Mai Waterfall: waterfall in the deep forest, a trip to visit requires an officer to lead the way.
Ton Tat Fah Waterfall
Ton Lat Waterfall

See also
List of national parks of Thailand
List of Protected Areas Regional Offices of Thailand

References

Further reading

External links
 

National parks of Thailand
Songkhla province
Tourist attractions in Songkhla province
Malaysia–Thailand border